Walter Newton "Bud" Read (February 8, 1918 – December 22, 2001) was an American lawyer and the second chairman of the New Jersey Casino Control Commission, from 1982 to 1989.

Biography
Read, whose nickname was "Bud," was born on February 8, 1918, in Camden, New Jersey. Read graduated from the University of Pennsylvania in 1939 and from University of Pennsylvania Law School in 1941. He served as a naval officer in World War II and retired from the United States Naval Reserve in 1962 with the rank of lieutenant commander.

Read was a partner in the law firm Archer, Greiner & Read. He left the firm in 1982 to accept appointment by Governor Thomas Kean as chairman of the New Jersey Casino Control Commission.

Read died on December 22, 2001, at his home in Cinnaminson Township, New Jersey at the age of 83 from cancer. Read's father, William T. Read, served as New Jersey State Treasurer and a State Senator.

References

1918 births
2001 deaths
United States Navy personnel of World War II
Members of American gaming commissions
New Jersey lawyers
New Jersey Republicans
People from Camden, New Jersey
People from Cinnaminson Township, New Jersey
University of Pennsylvania Law School alumni
United States Navy officers
Deaths from cancer in New Jersey
20th-century American lawyers
Military personnel from New Jersey